Strongtalk is a Smalltalk environment with optional static typing support. Strongtalk can make some compile time checks, and offer stronger type safety guarantees; this is the source of its name. It is non-commercial, though it was originally a commercial project developed by a small startup company named LongView Technologies (trading as Animorphic Systems).

History
David Griswold wanted to use Smalltalk more extensively, but then-extant implementations were insufficient for his needs. He wanted to improve the performance, add type-checking, and use native graphical user interface (GUI) widgets. His efforts resulted in the 1993 paper he co-authored with Gilad Bracha. This version was based on adding type-checking to the ParcPlace Systems implementation of Smalltalk. However, an implementation begun from scratch could gain a better typing system.

He became interested in the improvements that the team for the language Self had achieved, and envisioned the same methods used to improve Smalltalk. Urs Hölzle, who worked on the powerful Self compiler, spoke with Griswold about implementing the same type feedback in a Smalltalk compiler. Griswold, Hölzle, Lars Bak, and others formed a small company (LongView Technologies, doing business as Animorphic Systems) to re-implement Strongtalk. Work began in 1994 and they completed an implementation in 1996. The firm was bought by Sun Microsystems in 1997, and the team got focused on Java, releasing the HotSpot virtual machine, and work on Strongtalk stalled.

Sun released the 1997 re-implementation of Strongtalk as open-source software under a revised BSD license, including the Strongtalk system image in 2002, and the virtual machine in 2006.  Strongtalk is touted as the fastest implementation of Smalltalk. Strongtalk is available for Windows XP (other ports are in the works) and includes a basic development environment.

See also
 JavaScript
 HotSpot (Java virtual machine)

References

External links 
 
 Strong Smalltalk at smalltalk.org
 Strongtalk at Google Code

Class-based programming languages
Dynamically typed programming languages
Smalltalk programming language family